Maxim Igorevich Dubarenco (born 24 June 1993 in Chișinău, Moldova) is a Moldovan-born Belarusian tennis player.

He represented Moldova until 2015. As a member of the Moldova Davis Cup team he had a win–loss record of 7–10.

Junior Grand Slam finals

Doubles: 1 final (1 runner-up)

Challenger and Futures finals

Singles: 13 (10–3)

Davis Cup

Singles performances (6–8)

Doubles performances (1–2)

References

External links
 
 
 

Living people
1993 births
Sportspeople from Chișinău
Moldovan male tennis players
Belarusian male tennis players